The Johnstown Flood Museum is a history museum located in Johnstown, Pennsylvania, dedicated to the Johnstown Flood of 1889. The museum is housed in the former Cambria Public Library, which is part of the Downtown Johnstown Historic District.

The Johnstown Flood Museum chronicles the events of the flood through exhibits and media. The museum shows the documentary, The Johnstown Flood in the Robert S. Waters Theater. Exhibits include the relief map that uses lights and sounds to display the path of the flood. Surrounding the map are artifacts from the flood. The museum also features a restored "Oklahoma house", a temporary structure used to house flood survivors.

Building history
The Cambria Public Library building is a historic Carnegie library. It was built in 1890–1891, with funds provided by the philanthropist Andrew Carnegie.  It is one of 3,000 such libraries constructed between 1885 and 1919. Carnegie provided all funds toward the construction and maintenance of the library through 1930.  It is a three-story brick building with a tile roof encased in dormers in the French Gothic revival style.  It was damaged in the Johnstown flood of 1936 and ceased to function as a library in 1971.

It was added to the National Register of Historic Places in 1972.

References

External links

1973 establishments in Pennsylvania
Buildings and structures in Johnstown, Pennsylvania
History museums in Pennsylvania
Museums established in 1973
Museums in Cambria County, Pennsylvania
Tourist attractions in Johnstown, Pennsylvania
Library buildings completed in 1891
Carnegie libraries in Pennsylvania
Former library buildings in the United States
Libraries on the National Register of Historic Places in Pennsylvania
Gothic Revival architecture in Pennsylvania
Historic American Buildings Survey in Pennsylvania
National Register of Historic Places in Cambria County, Pennsylvania
Individually listed contributing properties to historic districts on the National Register in Pennsylvania